Khalid Hassan Milu (April 6, 1960 – March 29, 2005) was a Bangladeshi singer. He received the Bangladesh National Film Award for Best Male Playback Singer in 1994.

Career
Milu debuted his music career with the album Ogo Priyo Bandhobi in 1980. He has rendered about 5,000 songs. He went on to release 12 other solo albums. He performed as a playback singer in about 250 films.
Among his 12 other solo albums Protishodh Nio, Neela, Shesh Bhalobasha, Ayna and Manush are noteworthy. He had performed songs in about 250 films, including Shajani o shajani, Anek shadhonar porey, Je prem and others. He received the National Film Awards in 1994 and also many other prizes, including BACHSHASH awards.

Personal life and death
Milu married Fatema Hasan Polash on February 17, 1986. Together they have two sons, Protik Hasan (born January 12, 1987) who’s a musician and Pritom Hasan (born January 27, 1993), who is a musician, actor and model. He died from liver cirrhosis on March 29, 2005 at 12:10 am in Monowara Hospital located in Dhaka. He first suffered a brain hemorrhage in 2001 and reportedly visited Bangkok twice for treatment. His grave is located in Mirpur, Dhaka.

Discography

Solo albums
 Ogo Priyo Bandhobi (1980)
 Protishodh Nio
 Neela
 Shesh Bhalobasha
 Ayna
 Manush
Films
 Ontore Ontore (1994)
 Meghla Akash (2002)
 Shajani O Shajani
 Anek Shadhonar Porey
 Je Prem
 Bhalobashar Ghor 
 Praner Cheye Priyo

References

External links

1960 births
2005 deaths
People from Barisal
Deaths from cirrhosis
20th-century Bangladeshi male singers
20th-century Bangladeshi singers
Bangladeshi playback singers
Best Male Playback Singer National Film Award (Bangladesh) winners